Floyd Rose SpeedLoader is a floating  guitar bridge based on the Floyd Rose Original. In development since 1991, it was introduced to the public in 2003. This tremolo was developed in San Diego CA at AJ manufacturing by tool makers Jerry Morhman, Richard J Price, Steve Lamms, and Kerry L Stottlemyer under the direct guidance of Floyd Rose himself. With Richard J Price doing the majority of the design work and machining of the prototypes. Over 3000 hours and $150,000 were spent in developing this new ground breaking tremolo system and the first working unit on a guitar body. It inherited the locking floating bridge principle from the original version, but improved usability and diminished most of disadvantages that the Floyd Rose Original was criticized for, while adding the inconvenience of needing special-purpose strings. The Floyd Rose SpeedLoader is available in Tremolo, Fixed Bridge, and Convergent Tuning forms. However, the issues with strings became more apparent, as the specially made strings for the Speedloader were discontinued due to quality control issues. With no strings currently being manufactured, there is no way to properly string and set up any guitar with the Floyd Rose Speedloader. Customers have voiced their discontent with Floyd Rose for a lack of development of any parts that could remedy the situation.

Differences from the Floyd Rose Original 
The SpeedLoader bridges differ from the original 1977 bridges in that the procedure for changing strings has been made easier. The original string replacement procedure involved cutting the ball-end from a new guitar string, "locking" the freshly cut end into the bridge using an Allen wrench, winding and rough tuning the string by using the machine heads, locking the string at the nut (the second lock of the double-locking system), and finally tuning it utilizing the fine tuners.  When old strings are replaced with new strings, the tension provided on the floating bridge becomes slightly different, meaning that adjusting the tuning of one string with its machine head will undoubtedly alter the tuning of the other strings.  During the process of rough tuning a Floyd Rose equipped guitar, the locking nut is usually left unlocked throughout the entire string replacement procedure, which facilitates adjusting the tuning of all the strings using the machine heads.

However, the SpeedLoader bridge utilizes specially manufactured strings.  The strings are pre-cut to a very precise length (to sound very close to the right pitch when installed) and have special ends which snap into the bridge and nut.  Once the replacement strings are in place, fine-tuning is performed in a fashion similar to the Floyd Rose Original bridge.  The process for changing strings is simpler and faster; trained guitar technicians are able to change all 6 strings in under 30 seconds.

Consequently, guitars with Floyd Rose SpeedLoader bridges do not need any machine heads at all. For example, Floyd Rose Redmond series guitars come with a purely decorative headstock - unlike, for example, the Steinberger instruments without any visible headstock.

As with any guitar, ambient temperature, humidity, and string wear can affect the tuning. If the fine tuners alone are not enough to tune guitar properly, the SpeedLoader bridge has range tuning screws, one for each string, that control the range of each fine tuner's action.

Like the original Floyd Rose bridge, the SpeedLoader bridge is a truly "floating" bridge and has some of the same disadvantages associated with it. Often, to alleviate these disadvantages, Floyd Rose Original owners utilize a custom mechanism called a tremstopper that is able to lock the floating tremolo fully (or partially) and make it behave like a fixed bridge. The Floyd Rose SpeedLoader Tremolo includes a built-in tremstopper.

Finally, according to multiple interviews, Floyd Rose Guitars would not license manufacturing of these bridges to third-party vendors, as previous experience with Floyd Rose Licensed bridges showed that such "licensed" bridges cannot match original standards of quality.

Advantages 

 All the advantages of Floyd Rose Original, including ability to bend notes both up and down, wide bending range and extremely stable string tuning.
 Eliminates most of disadvantages of the original system, including long and tedious process of instrument restringing, balancing the tremolo, etc.
 Built-in tremstopper.

Disadvantages 

 The most criticized disadvantage of new tremolo system is a requirement of special strings with bulleted ends. Strings should be precisely cut and should not stretch (so called "string float") non-elastically much from original length with applied tension, changing the pitch. String should be perfectly elastic in the range of Floyd Rose action. 
All these requirements make string manufacturing harder than normal, thus, generally, prices for such strings tend to be higher. So far, there was only one company producing such special strings: Dean Markley, though the packaging of the strings features nowhere the company name and only the "Floyd Rose SpeedLoader" logos.  To date, the company no longer produces the strings and Floyd Rose Speedloader owners have no purchase options for new strings with the company itself providing no updates on when they might be available again.
The other factor is string availability: it's virtually impossible to find such strings on sale in some regions, and prices for such rare imported goods may go up to 400-500%. Note that as of 1/26/2017, 14 years after the bridge was released to the public, you cannot buy these strings anywhere. Without the ability to replace strings, these bridges are essentially useless.
If a speedloader string breaks, it must be replaced completely - one cannot just shift and re-use the rest of string length as is sometimes, but very rarely, possible with other bridges.

References

Guitar bridges